The Asus Eee Top (with the second word pronounced ) is a touch screen all-in-one desktop computer designed by Asus and released in November 2008. Its motherboard employs Splashtop technology called "ExpressGate" by Asus.

There are four models in this series, the ET1602, ET1603, ET2002 and ET2203d.

The ET 1602 and 1603 models feature a 1.6 GHz Intel Atom processor, wide-screen (16:9) 15.6" display, 1 GB of DDR2 RAM, 160 GB SATA HDD, 802.11b/g/draft-n Wi-Fi, speakers, SD card reader and a 1.3MP webcam with Windows XP Home modified with Asus' big-icon Easy Mode.

The difference between the models is in the graphics cards. The 1602 has integrated graphics chipset, but the 1603 includes a separate video card, the ATI Mobility Radeon HD 3450.

In August 2009, two more models were introduced, the ET2002 and ET2203. The ET2002 is the first all-in-one to use the Nvidia Ion platform with the Atom 330 and nVidia GeForce 9400 IGP. The ET2203 includes a Blu-ray player, a Core 2 Duo T6600 processor and an ATI Mobility Radeon HD 4570 graphics card. These models can also be used as standalone monitors with the ability to connect an HDMI-equipped gaming console such as the PS3 or Xbox 360, and other HDMI-equipped peripherals to the HDMI input.

Models

See also
HP TouchSmart
 iMac

References

External links
PCPRO Asus Eee Top ET1602 review
Stuff.tv Asus Eee Top review
PC Advisor Asus Eee Top 1602 review
HEXUS.net: Review: ASUS Eee Top ET1602: a glimpse of computers to come?
Legit Reviews: ASUS Eee Top Review - Touch Screen Desktop PC
 Best Thin Bezel Monitor

Eee Top
Touchscreens
Discontinued products
All-in-one desktop computers